Kihnu Strait is a strait in Estonia, locating between Kihnu and Continental Estonia; this strait is part of Baltic Sea.

Strait's width is about 12 km.

References

Geography of Estonia